The Broxbourne Council election, 2000 was held to elect council members of the Broxbourne Borough Council, the local government authority of the borough of Broxbourne, Hertfordshire, England.

Composition of expiring seats before election

Election results

Results summary 
An election was held in 12 wards on 4 May 2000.

There was no election in Rosedale Ward.

The Conservative Party won all 12 seats making 1 gain at the expense of the Labour Party in Waltham Cross Ward.

Mark Farrington won Cheshunt North Ward for the Conservative Party having "crossed the floor" of the council chamber since the 1999 local government election when he had won a Cheshunt North seat for the Labour Party.

This was the first local election since 1995 where the British National Party had fielded any candidates.

The new political balance of the council following this election was:

Conservative 35 seats
Labour 3 seats

Ward results

References

Broxbourne Borough Council elections
Broxbourne
2000s in Hertfordshire